Esporte Clube Siderúrgica, commonly known as Siderúrgica, is a Brazilian football club based in Sabará, Minas Gerais state. They competed in the Taça Brasil once and won the Campeonato Mineiro twice.

History
The club was founded on May 31, 1930. Siderúrgica won the Campeonato Mineiro in 1937, and in 1964. They competed in the Taça Brasil in 1965, when they finished the tournament in seventh place.

In 1967 the  ceased its financial support to the club and so Siderúrgica ceased its own Professional Football department and became an amateur club again.

The club played professional tournaments in 1992, 1997 and 2007, in the Campeonato Mineiro Módulo II of these three years, unsuccessfully trying to return to higher levels of the State championship. In 2011, Siderúrgica will play the Segunda Divisão again.

Achievements
 Campeonato Mineiro:
 Winners (2): 1937, 1964

Stadium
Esporte Clube Siderúrgica plays their home games at Estádio Praia do Ó. The stadium had a maximum capacity of 4,000 people. In 2011, due to problems with their stadium, Siderúrgica played in Estádio Israel Pinheiro, in Itabira.

References

Association football clubs established in 1930
Football clubs in Minas Gerais
1930 establishments in Brazil